The School is an Australian horror and psychological thriller film, directed by Storm Ashwood and released in 2018. The film stars Milly Alcock, Will McDonald, Nicholas Hope, Megan Drury, Texas Watterston, Jack Ruwald and Alexia Santosuosso and it played at the Vision Splendid Film Festival. The School was filmed in 2017 at Gladesville Mental Hospital in Sydney, Australia. The film was produced by Jim Robison at Lunar Pictures and Blake Northfield at Bronte Pictures and was sold to North American distributor Vertical Entertainment by film sales agent Cinema Management Group.

References 

Australian horror thriller films
2018 horror thriller films